Amir Temraz (born 12 August 1977) is an Egyptian rower. He competed in the men's coxless pair event at the 2000 Summer Olympics.

References

External links
 
 

1977 births
Living people
Egyptian male rowers
Olympic rowers of Egypt
Rowers at the 2000 Summer Olympics
Place of birth missing (living people)